Alexa Kate Stonehouse (born 5 December 2004) is an English cricketer who currently plays for Kent, South East Stars and Trent Rockets. She plays as a left-arm medium bowler.

Early life
Stonehouse was born on 5 December 2004 in Ashford, Kent.

Domestic career
Stonehouse made her county debut in 2021, for Kent against Middlesex in the 2021 Women's Twenty20 Cup. She played four matches that season as her side won the South East Group of the competition. She took four wickets for Kent in the 2022 Women's Twenty20 Cup, including best bowling figures of 3/27.

In 2021, Stonehouse was named in the South East Stars academy squad. Later that year, in June, it was announced that Stonehouse had signed a contract with the senior team, and made her debut for the side a day later, in the opening match of the Charlotte Edwards Cup, against Lightning. She went on to play five matches in the tournament, taking two wickets, as the South East Stars emerged victorious. She played 13 matches for South East Stars in 2022, across the Charlotte Edwards Cup and the Rachael Heyhoe Flint Trophy, taking seven wickets. She was also in the Trent Rockets squad for The Hundred, but did not play a match. She also played for England A against South Africa in June 2022. At the end of the 2022 season, it was announced that Stonehouse had signed her first professional contract with South East Stars.

International career
In October 2022, Stonehouse was selected in the England Under-19 squad for the 2023 ICC Under-19 Women's T20 World Cup. She took six wickets in her five matches at the tournament, at an average of 11.33.

References

External links

2004 births
Living people
People from Ashford, Kent
Kent women cricketers
South East Stars cricketers